This list of tallest buildings in Virginia ranks skyscrapers over  tall in the U.S. Commonwealth of Virginia by height. The antenna spire however accounts for 95 feet of the building, leaving its rooftop at 413 ft. In comparison, the Capital One Building in Tysons has its roof at 470 ft. Both buildings have their highest occupied floor significantly lower than each building's official height.

Tallest buildings

Timeline of tallest buildings

Tallest under construction, approved, or proposed 
This lists buildings that are under construction, approved for construction or proposed for construction in Virginia.

* Table entries with dashes (—) indicate that information regarding building heights, floor counts, or dates of completion has not yet been released.

Tallest no longer standing

See also
 List of tallest buildings in Norfolk
 List of tallest buildings in Arlington
 List of tallest buildings in Richmond
 List of tallest buildings in Virginia Beach
 List of tallest buildings in Tysons, Virginia

References

Tallest
Virginia